Pelaghia Roșu (1800 – 10 June 1870) was a Romanian revolutionary who participated in the Wallachian Revolution of 1848. She commanded a battalion of females in defense of her village.

She was born in Mărișel, a small village near Cluj-Napoca. Her father, Ioan Dufle, made military instructions at home, using Romanian books.

She was married to Ioan Roșu and had one child, named Indei (Andrei).

References
 Păcățian, Teodor V. - Cartea de aur sau luptele politice-naționale ale românilor de sub coroana ungară, volume I, 2nd edition, Sibiu, Tipografia Iosif Marschall
 Șandor, Teodor - Mărișel și Fântânele, istorie vie, Făclia, ziar independent de Cluj, 11 July 2008

1800 births
1870 deaths
19th-century Romanian people
Women in 19th-century warfare
People of the Revolutions of 1848
Romanian revolutionaries
Women in European warfare
19th-century Romanian women
People from Cluj County